Chah Ab (also Romanized as Chāh Āb) is a village in Dughayi Rural District, in the Central District of Quchan County, Razavi Khorasan Province, Iran. The current Agha of the village is Tilar Reeze Hossein who began his reign in 1999. At the 2006 census, its population was 45, in 15 families.

References 

Populated places in Quchan County